Hwang Ryong-hak is a North Korean wrestler who won the gold medal in the 66 kg division in the 2013 Asian Wrestling Championships by defeating Yang Jae-Hoon of South Korea in the final.

References

Living people
Wrestlers at the 2014 Asian Games
North Korean male sport wrestlers
Year of birth missing (living people)
Asian Games competitors for North Korea
Asian Wrestling Championships medalists
21st-century North Korean people